Euptera dorothea, the western euptera, is a butterfly in the family Nymphalidae. It is found in Guinea, Sierra Leone, Ivory Coast and Ghana. The habitat consists of forests.

Subspecies
Euptera dorothea dorothea (Guinea, Sierra Leone)
Euptera dorothea warrengashi Libert, 2002 (Guinea, Ivory Coast, western Ghana) (named in honour of Haydon Warren-Gash)

References

Butterflies described in 1904
Euptera